Bosha may refer to:

 The Kingdom of Garo
 Bosha (Roma), an ethnic group in historic Armenia.